is a railway station in the city of Kasugai, Aichi Prefecture,  Japan, operated by Meitetsu. It is close to Ajiyoshi Station of the same name, but which is on the Jōhoku Line, operated by a different company, the Tōkai Transport Service Company.

Lines

Station layout
The station has one island platform connected to the station building by a footbridge. The station has automated ticket machines, Manaca automated turnstiles and is unattended..

Platforms

Adjacent stations

|-
!colspan=5|Nagoya Railroad

Station history
Ajiyoshi Station was opened on February 11, 1931.

Passenger statistics
In fiscal 2017, the station was used by an average of 4894 passengers daily.

Surrounding area
Chita Junior High School
Ajiyoshi Junior High School
Ajiyoshi Elementary School

See also
 List of Railway Stations in Japan

References

External links

 Official web page 

Railway stations in Japan opened in 1931
Railway stations in Aichi Prefecture
Stations of Nagoya Railroad
Kasugai, Aichi